Franjo Jakovac (born 24 January 1961) is a Croatian biathlete. He competed in the relay event at the 1984 Winter Olympics.

References

1961 births
Living people
Croatian male biathletes
Olympic biathletes of Yugoslavia
Biathletes at the 1984 Winter Olympics
People from Primorje-Gorski Kotar County